Goldfields is a computer game for children which simulates 'life on the diggings' during a 19th-century gold rush. Beginning with a concept by Trevor Jacob, it was developed and published by Jacaranda Software in Australia in 1986. It was first released for Apple II, BBC Micro, Commodore 64 and IBM compatible systems. The first Macintosh version was later developed using Hypercard. The original Goldfields package contained a disk, teacher's guide, four black-line masters and a copy of A Goldfields Journal or A Guide to Prospective Gold Seekers. A review in Australian Educational Computing magazine described it as 'a particularly useful package, adaptable to a number of levels in both upper primary and secondary social science classes.' The game also received a favourable review from the Australian Journal of Reading in 1986. Despite its age, Goldfields remains well regarded as a mining-themed economic simulator with integrated action sequences.

Due to its ongoing popularity with children and educators, it was rewritten from scratch for Windows XP and Macintosh OSX by Greygum Software in 2007, who bought the rights to the title after Jacaranda Software's closure in the early 1990s.

An emulated version is available to play on archive.org.

References 

Simulation video games
Educational games